Mónica Bello is a Spanish curator and art historian. She is a Fellow at the Royal Society for the encouragement of Arts, Manufactures and Commerce. In her curatorial work she discusses the way artists instigate new conversations around emergent culture and societal phenomena, such as the role of science and technology in the perception of reality. For more than 15 years she has been curating exhibitions and events internationally in collaboration with leading artists, designers, researchers and scientists of various disciplines.

Since 2015 she is the curator and head of arts at CERN at the European Organization for Nuclear Research in Geneva, Switzerland. At CERN she curates the research-led artistic residencies and the new art commissions that reflect on the conversations and exchanges between artists and particle physicists and engineers as well as staff of the laboratory.

In 2018 she was invited as guest curator of the Audemars Piguet Art Commission for Art Basel 2018. In her curatorial role she selected a number of artists for the commission and curated the final exhibition launched during the art fair. Semiconductor, the artist duo based in Brighton, were the recipients of the commission. Their project HALO was selected and commissioned.

Prior to her arrival to Geneva she held the position of artistic director of VIDA (2010-2015) at Fundación Telefónica, Madrid (Spain), an award that aimed to foster cross-cultural expressions around the notion of life. She initiated and ran (2007-2010) the Department of Education at Laboral Centro de Arte, Gijón (Spain). In 2004 she co-initiated Capsula in collaboration with Finnish curator Ulla Taipale. Capsula is a curatorial platform with a focus in the topics of art, science and nature, with an initial focus in biological and ecological art related practices. In 2003 she was recipient of the Emergent Curators Award Inéditos at Casa Encendida Madrid. In her award-winning exhibition Organisms became one of the first exhibitions of bioart in Spain - with works as Meart The Semi-Living artist and Pig Wings by the Tissue Culture & Art Project.

Recent curatorial projects 

Semiconductor, a solo exhibition of the artistic duo Semiconductor at Museo Nacional de Cerillos, Santiago de Chile, October - December 2019. As part of the 14th Bienal de Artes Mediales de Santiago.
Quàntica, an exhibition on art and physics at CCCB, Barcelona. From April to September, 2019. Co-curated with José-Carlos Mariátegui. The exhibition Quantum gives us the keys to understanding the principles of Quantum physics, and it does so through the joint creative work of scientists and artists. The project invites the public to browse freely, to awaken their curiosity, and to critically evaluate the new paradigms of modern science.
Broken Symmetries, at FACT, Liverpool. November 2018- March 2019. A touring exhibition featuring ten art projects resulting from Arts at CERN's Collide International in collaboration with FACT, Liverpool. Touring to Barcelona, Brussels and Nantes as 'Quantica/ Quantum', from 2019-2021. Co-curated with José-Carlos Mariátegui. List of artists: Julieta Aranda, Dianne Bauer, James Bridle, Juan Cortés, Jack Jelfs and Haroon Mirza, Yunchul Kim, Lea Porsager, Semiconductor, Suzanne Treister, Yu-Chen Wang.
HALO. Audemars Piguet Arts Commission, Art Basel, Basel. June 2018. Audemars Piguet Art Commission supports artists in the creation of works of exceptional complexity, precision, and experiential impact on an ongoing, annual basis. The newly commissioned art works, overseen by an annual guest curator and selected by an international advisory board, are presented to the public to coincide with Art Basel. British artist-duo Semiconductor, Ruth Jarman and Joe Gerhardt, have been selected to create HALO, an immersive installation using data from the ATLAS experiment at the Large Hadron Collider, in collaboration with CERN.
Llull- Kurokawa In the Light of Ideas, Centre d'Art Santa Mònica, Barcelona. October 2017. Co-curated with Andy Gracie. Artist: Ryoichi Kurokawa. Exhibition design: Olga Subirós. A contemporary outlook on the figure of Ramon Llull, mystic and visionary, and the parallels between his work and modern science 700 years after his death. In his intense inquiry into the laws of nature and the world, Llull combines mysticism, logic and science. And while he expresses himself within the insufficiency of the conventional Christian system, he draws on the confluence of all the knowledge of his time.
Dark Matter, The Invisible Around Us, 5th Touch Me Festival, Zagreb. October 2017. Co-curated with KONTEJNER. The exhibition refers to the hidden events and phenomena that cannot reach us at any degree of perceptual significance and how artists define, design and build up creative modes for exploration and interaction within the hidden events that lie within the core of nature. Artists: Filip Borelli, Alfonso Borragán, Ivan Curić, Kerstin Ergenzinger, Martin Howse, Yunchul Kim, Vanessa Lorenzo, Ale de la Puente, Semiconductor, Ana Sladetić & Nika Jurlin, Martina Zelenika MOON.
Vanishing Points. Centro Nacional de las Artes, Ciudad de México, September - November 2015. As part of Transitio06. Artists: Boredom Research, Paolo Cirio, Joan Leandre, Lisa Ma, Jason Rohrer, Karolina Sobecka. The exhibition examined the rise of a collective consciousness of the world and how it is determined by the digital technologies.
VIDA Awards Annual Exhibitions. ARCO Art Fair. Fundación Telefónica stand. 2010-2014

Articles, publications 

Bello Bugallo, M. and Gracie, A., (2020). Black Holes and Objectivity. Artnodes, (25). DOI: http://doi.org/10.7238/a.v0i25.3332
Bello M. (2019) Field Experiences: Fundamental Science and Research in the Arts. In: Wuppuluri S., Wu D. (eds) On Art and Science. The Frontiers Collection. Springer, Cham. DOI: https://doi.org/10.1007/978-3-030-27577-8_13

References

External links 
 https://arts.cern/
 https://www.fact.co.uk/event/broken-symmetries
 http://www.cccb.org/en/exhibitions/file/quantica-in-search-of-the-invisible/230323
 https://www.audemarspiguet.com/en/experience/art-commission/
 https://ars.electronica.art/artandscience/de/network/partner/arts-cern/
 http://www.artbarcelona.es/circuit/en/expositions/llull-kurokawa-a-la-llum-de-les-idees/
 http://www.06.transitiomx.net/cura.html
 https://vida.fundaciontelefonica.com/en/
 http://userwww.sfsu.edu/infoarts/links/wilson.artlinks2.bio.html

Year of birth missing (living people)
Living people
Spanish curators
Spanish art critics
Spanish women art critics
People associated with CERN
Spanish women curators